Christian cult may refer to:

 Cult (religious practice)
 Christian new religious movements

See also
 Cult (disambiguation)